Brigadier (Brig) is a senior rank in the Sri Lanka Army. Brigadier is a superior rank to Colonel, but inferior to Major-General. The rank has a NATO rank code of OF-6, equivalent to Commodore in the Sri Lanka Navy and Air Commodore in the Sri Lanka Air Force. It corresponds to the rank of brigadier general in many other nations. In the Sri Lanka Army, brigadier is the highest field officer rank (hence the absence of the word "general"), whereas brigadier-general is the lowest "general" rank in many armies. However, the two ranks are considered equal.

Initially Brigadier was not considered to be a General Officer rank by the Sri Lanka Army, however since the 1980s the rank had limited recognition as a General Officer rank as the rank holders had GOC (divisional commanders) appointments, getting staff cars designated with a single star, currently brigadiers do not get the 'general' status. The rank insignia for a Brigadier is a Sri Lanka emblem over three "pips", in the British style. An officer serving as a Brigadier would be retired after four years in the substantive rank, which is the maximum permissible service in the rank, due to lack of vacancies or not been selected for further career progression.

From 1949 to 1958, the Commander of the Ceylon Army held the rank of Brigadier.

See also
Sri Lanka Army ranks and insignia
Sri Lanka Navy rank insignia
Sri Lanka Air Force rank insignia
Sri Lanka Army
Military of Sri Lanka
Comparative military ranks
Military rank

References

Army, Sri Lanka. (1st Edition - October 1999). "50 YEARS ON" - 1949-1999, Sri Lanka Army.

External links 
Sri Lanka Army
Ministry of Defence, Public Security, Law & Order - Democratic Socialist Republic of Sri Lanka
Three Service Commanders promoted : Official Government News Portal 

Military ranks of the Sri Lanka Army